Spark Networks SE is an American-German dating company with a portfolio of brands designed for singles seeking serious relationships. These online dating brands include Zoosk, SilverSingles, EliteSingles, Jdate, ChristianMingle, eDarling, JSwipe, AdventistSingles, LDSSingles, and Attractive World. Formed in 2017 through the merger of Affinitas GmbH and Spark Networks, Inc., the company has a presence in 29 countries worldwide. It is publicly listed on the Nasdaq exchange under the ticker symbol "LOV".

On July 1, 2019, Spark Networks closed on their previously announced acquisition of Zoosk, Inc., forming North America's second-largest dating company in revenues. The deal increased Spark's global monthly paying subscribers to over 1 million.

Chelsey Grayson became interim CEO of Spark Networks on Dec 1, 2022.

Websites

Zoosk 

Zoosk is an online dating service available in 25 languages and in more than 80 countries. The founders of the company are Shayan Zadeh and Alex Mehr, who ran the company until December 2014. In mid-2019, Zoosk was acquired for a reported $255 million by Spark Networks.

Christian Mingle 

Initially launched in 2001, ChristianMingle.com is an online community of Christian singles. The site serves singles who are looking to date and marry within the Christian faith. Christian Mingle has over 9 million registered members. Users can access the site in English, German, Spanish, or French.

The plot of the film Christian Mingle features the website.

JDate 

Launched in 1997, Jdate.com is a niche dating site that caters to Jewish singles. It has more than 750,000 members worldwide. Users can access the site in English, German, Spanish, French, or Hebrew. A survey commissioned by Jdate in 2011 showed 52 percent of married respondents met on Jdate.

EliteSingles 
Designed for educated professionals seeking committed, long-term relationships, EliteSingles was launched in 2013 and operates in 19 countries. Over 90% of members are 30+.

SilverSingles 
SilverSingles is a dating site aimed at those interested in over-50 dating and long-term relationships. SilverSingles started life as PrimeSingles.net in 2002, changing to Single Seniors Meet in 2009 and, finally, to SilverSingles in 2011, when it became part of Spark Networks, Inc.

eDarling 
Launched in 2009, eDarling is a European online partner agency aimed at singles looking for long-term relationships.

JSwipe 

JSwipe is a Jewish online dating app launched on Passover 2014 by Smooch Labs, and acquired by Spark Networks in October 2015 for $7 million, ending contentious patent and trademark litigation between the two companies.

Attractive World 
Attractive World is a dating site that allows existing members to decide whether or not new applicants are suitable to join the community based on their submitted profiles.

Other websites
In addition, a number of properties are included in Spark Networks’ portfolio, including LDS Singles and Adventist Singles.

History 
The company was founded by Joe Y. Shapira in 1997 under the name MatchNet plc.

Jdate.com, founded in 1997, was the company's first venture into online dating. The company was also home to Christian Mingle, which was launched in 2001.

The company went public on June 27, 2000, on Germany's Neuer Markt.

In January 2005, the company changed its name to Spark Networks because management felt that the new name more sharply distinguished the company in the marketplace.

On November 10, 2014, Jdate launched a dating app designed for Jewish singles.

On October 14, 2015, Spark Networks announced the acquisition of Smooch Labs, owner of the popular millennial Jewish dating app JSwipe. Spark Networks launched CROSSPATHS, a dating app that helps like-minded Christians find matches, on October 8, 2015.

Redesigns of the Jdate and Christian Mingle websites were announced in 2015. In addition to revamped branding, the site makeovers featured technology changes (including expanded mobile capabilities), a re-designed inbox and a new “daily matches” feature. Jdate's redesign went live on November 18, 2015, while Christian Mingle's went live on December 17, 2015.

On November 2, 2017, Spark Networks SE (NYSE American: LOV) announced the completion of the previously announced merger of Spark Networks, Inc. and Affinitas GmbH in a stock-for-stock transaction. The combination created a worldwide online dating platform, with brands including EliteSingles, eDarling, Jdate, Christian Mingle, JSwipe, and Attractive World serving a spectrum of users across 29 countries and 15 languages.

On October 3, 2018, Spark was fined $500,000 and ordered to pay $985,000 in restitution in response to complaints that the site was automatically renewing customer accounts without their express consent. The company was sued by the Santa Monica city attorney as well as district attorneys in four counties.

On March 21, 2019, Spark entered into a definitive agreement to acquire Zoosk, Inc.  The deal was finalized on July 1, 2019, forming North America's second-largest dating company in revenues and increasing Spark's global monthly paying subscribers increase to over 1 million.

On February 15, 2022, the company's stocks were transferred from the NYSE American to the Nasdaq Capital Market exchange.

Operations
Previously based in Beverly Hills, California, Spark Networks is now based in Berlin, Germany.

In 2013, the company authorized the repurchase of $5 million of its outstanding common stock as a reflection of confidence in the long-term business.

References

External links

Companies listed on the Nasdaq
Companies formerly listed on NYSE American
Online dating services of Germany